Culladia yomii is a moth in the family Crambidae. It was described by Schouten in 1993. It is found in Suriname.

References

Crambini
Moths described in 1993
Moths of South America